Karma Cola is a non-fiction book about India written by Gita Mehta originally published in 1979 by Simon & Schuster.

Subject matter 

The story begins in the late '60s, when hundreds of thousands of Westerners descended upon India, disciples of a cultural revolution that proclaimed that the magic and mystery missing from their lives was to be found in the East. An Indian writer who has also lived in England and the United States, Gita Mehta observed the spectacle of European and American "pilgrims" interacting with their hosts, and recorded her observations in Karma Cola. It describes the traditions of an ancient and long-lived society being turned into commodities and sold to those who don't understand them.

Editions 
Reprints include:

References

Indian non-fiction books
Indian literature in English
Books about India
1979 non-fiction books
Books about spirituality
20th-century Indian books